NGC 4706 is a lenticular galaxy located about 157 million light-years away in the constellation Centaurus. It was discovered by astronomer John Herschel on June 5, 1834. NGC 4706 is a member of the Centaurus Cluster.

See also 
 List of NGC objects (4001–5000)

References

External links

Centaurus (constellation)
Lenticular galaxies
4706 
43411 
Centaurus Cluster
Astronomical objects discovered in 1834